The Gobi jerboa (Allactaga bullata) is a species of rodent in the family Dipodidae. It is found in China and Mongolia. Its natural habitats are temperate grassland and temperate desert.

The Gobi jerboa was discovered in 1925 by Glover Morrill Allen. It is found in the Gobi Desert located in northern and northwestern China, as well as in southern Mongolia, and is considered to be the most “desert loving” out of all Gobi rodents (Smith and Xie 2008). Allen first examined an adult male Gobi jerboa from Tsagan Nor, Outer Mongolia, which was collected on July 5, 1922 by the Central Asiatic Expeditions and housed at the American Museum of Natural History (Allen 1925). Allen further compared the subspecies Allactaga sibirica annulata and Allactaga sibirica sibirica, to the Gobi jerboa because they are all sympatric. Allen examined forty specimens collected from different regions of Mongolia, and found that while the Gobi jerboa was similar in color and appearance to A. sibirica annulata, by exhibiting the same grayer and buffier phases, the Gobi jerboa has shorter and broader ears, smaller hind feet, and a much larger globular audital bullae (nearly three times the size), which differentiates it from A. sibirica annulata. The Gobi jerboa was differentiated from A. sibirica sibirica because of its enlarged and globular auditory bullae, and its nearly vertical upper incisors (Allen 1925). Today, there have been 163 recorded occurrences of the Gobi jerboa, however there is currently no known data that examines its population status (The Global Biodiversity Information Facility 2013 and Batsaikhan et al. 2008).

Range

The Gobi jerboa is native to China and Mongolia (Smith and Xie 2008). In China, the Gobi jerboa extends west into Xinjiang, east into Nei Mongol, and north into Gansu. In Mongolia, the gobi jerboa can be found in the Great Lakes Depression, Valley of the Lakes, Northern Gobi, Dzungarian, Gobi Desert, Trans Altai Gobi Desert and Alashani Gobi Desert (Sokolov et al. 1998). Approximately 21% of the Gobi jerboa's range in Mongolia is in protected areas (Clark et al. 2006).

Habitat

The Gobi jerboa is found in desert and steppe habitats, which are particularly well vegetated. Saltwort, ephedra, and desert bushes characterize these landscapes in China (Smith and Xie 2008). The gobi jerboa are nocturnal rodents which live alone, and spend most of the daylight hours in unplugged burrows that are relatively simple, and can extend up to 60 cm in length. These burrows are readily visible in the light sand, and contain well-defined nesting chambers without bedding (Smith and Xie 2008). Their diet consists of seeds, roots, tubers, insects (grasshoppers and beetles), and larvae (Smith and Xie 2008). There are no known major threats to this species (Batsaikhan et al. 2008).

Breeding

Gobi jerboa reproduce between May and August once or twice a year, and can have between one and three offspring per litter. (Smith and Xie 2008). The mother has a rather long pregnancy, and the young are born naked and helpless. Newborn Gobi jerboas develop slower than most rodents; they are not able to jump until around 11 weeks of age and are not sexually mature until 14 weeks of age. However, although they develop slower, they tend to have a longer life expectancy than most rodents-up to 6 years in the wild (Sharp, J.).

Physical attributes

The Gobi jerboa is similar to Allactaga siberica in color. Its fur is light, and the entirety of its back, as well as the outer sides of its thigh, is grayish buff. The underside of the Gobi jerboa, as well as the forearms, hind limbs, and upper lip are pure white to the roots of the hair. Additionally, a prominent hip strip adorns the outside of the hind end of the thigh. This strip is slightly more reddish in color than the Allactaga balikuncia (Smith and Xie 2008). The tail is covered with well-developed tufted hairs, and while the base of the underside of the tail consists of white tufts, the inner surface is composed of a black portion with a white median longitudinal strip, and the tip of the tail is pure white (Smith and Xie 2008). The Gobi jerboa's tail helps to accelerate its bipedal gallop (Evans and Hutchins). The auditory bullae are very large in size, and almost meet at the front of the skull (Smith and Xie 2008). The dental formula of the Gobi jerboa is I 1/1 C 0/0 P 1/1 M 2/2 (R. Taylor). One of the most prominent features of the Gobi jerboa are their ears, since they are almost three times as large as their heads. Their large ears give them an extra keen hearing sense, which helps to serve as extra protection in their vulnerable environment. The great size of their ears also helps to cool their bodies by dissipating heat, since they reside in deserts which can get extremely hot during the day (Wild Tracks).

Conservation actions

The Gobi jerboa was listed as “Least Concern” in China on the Red List Category and Criteria by the IUCN Red List of Threatened Species, and listed as “Data Deficient” in Mongolia (Wang and Xie 2004 and Clark et al. 2006). This ranking is based on the Gobi jerboa's wide range, presumed large population size, prevalence in protected areas, and the fact that their population is not declining at rates which would qualify the species as threatened (Clark et al. 2006).

References

Bibliography 

Allen, G. M. 1940. The mammals of China and Mongolia. American Museum of Natural History, New York, NY, USA. 
Batsaikhan, N., Avirmed, D., Shar, S. & Smith, A.T. 2008. Allactaga bullata. In: IUCN 2013. IUCN Red List of Threatened Species. Version 2013.2. <www.iucnredlist.org>. Downloaded on 18 February 2014.
Clark, E. L., Munkhbat, J., Dulamtseren, S., Baillie, J. E.M., Batsaikhan, N., Samiya, R. and Stubbe, M. (eds). 2006. Mongolian Red List of Mammals. Regional Red List Series. pp. 159 pp.. Zoological Society of London, London, UK.
Ellerman, J. R., Hayman, R. W. and Holt, G. W. C. 1940. The families and genera of living rodents Vol. 1 British Museum, London, England.
Evans, A. and Hutchins, M. et al. 2003–2004. Birch Mice, Jumping Mice, and Jerboas (Dipodidae). Grzimek's Animal Life Encyclopedia. Mammals V. 2nd Edition. Cengage Learning, 2005.
Holden, M. E. and G. G. Musser. 2005. Family Dipodidae. pp. 871–893 in Mammal Species of the World a Taxonomic and Geographic Reference. D. E. Wilson and D. M. Reeder eds. Johns Hopkins University Press, Baltimore.
Mallon, D. P. 1985. The mammals of the Mongolian People's Republic. Mammal Review 15(2): 71-102.
Sharp, J 1996. The Jerboa. Desert USA. http://www.desertusa.com/animals/jerboa.html
Smith, A. and Xie, Y. 2008. The Mammals of China. Princeton University Press, Princeton, New Jersey.
Sokolov, V. E., Lobachev, V. S. and Orlov, V. N. 1998. The mammals of Mongolia, Part. 2: Dipodidae: Dipodinae, Allactaginae. Nauka, Moscow, Russia.
Taylor, R. 1853. Descriptive Catalogue of the Osteological Series Contained in the Museum of the Royal College of Surgeons of England, Volume II. Fleet Street Press, London.
Wang, S. and Xie, Y. 2004. China Species Red List. Vol. 1 Red List. Higher Education Press, Beijing, China.
The Global Biodiversity Information Facility: GBIF Backbone Taxonomy, 2013-07-01.  Accessed via https://www.gbif.org/species/2439492 on 2014-02-21
Wild Tracks. The Ears Have It. World Press 2009.
Wilson, D. E. and Reeder, D. M. 1993. Mammal Species of the World. A Taxonomic and Geographic Reference. Smithsonian Institution Press, Washington, DC, USA.

Allactaga
Rodents of Asia
Rodents of China
Mammals of Mongolia
Gobi Desert
Taxa named by Glover Morrill Allen
Mammals described in 1925
Taxonomy articles created by Polbot